Tattenhall is a former civil parish, now in the parish of Tattenhall and District, in Cheshire West and Chester, England. It contains 27 buildings that are recorded in the National Heritage List for England as designated listed buildings.  Of these, three are listed at Grade II*, the middle grade, and the others are at Grade II, the lowest grade.  Apart from the village of Tattenhall, the parish is rural.  In the village the listed buildings include the church and its sundial, the war memorial, and houses and cottages, some dating from the 17th century and with a timber-framed core.  Outside the village, the listed buildings include country houses and associated structures, other houses and cottages, farmhouses, and a boundary stone.

Key

Buildings

References
Citations

Sources

 

Listed buildings in Cheshire West and Chester
Lists of listed buildings in Cheshire